George Boemler (died June 1968) was an American film editor. He edited many films in the 1930s-1960s like Hollywood Party, The Bride Goes Wild, The Power and the Prize, Run Silent, Run Deep, and Five Weeks in a Balloon. He was nominated for an Emmy Award in 1963 for his work on Ben Casey.

References

External links
George Boemler on IMDb

1968 deaths
American film editors
Burials at Westwood Village Memorial Park Cemetery